The River Lea is a steep continuous river located in the north-western region of Tasmania, Australia.

The river flows during the Tasmanian winter and spring, with flow reducing over the dryer summer months.

Located in a remote wilderness area, the Lea River is the site of the annual Lea Extreme Race.

Named places on the Lea River

See also

References

Rivers of Tasmania
Lists of coordinates
Northern Tasmania